The individual dressage at the 2015 European Dressage Championships in Aachen, Germany was held at Stade Michel d'Ornano from 12 to 16 August.

Great Britain's Charlotte Dujardin won gold medal in both Grand Prix Special and Grand Prix Freestyle, repeating her success from 2013 European Dressage Championship held in Herning, Denmark. Kristina Bröring-Sprehe representing the host nation Germany won a silver medal in both Grand Prix Freestyle and Grand Prix Special. Hans Peter Minderhoud of Netherlands won a bronze in special, his first ever individual championship medal while Spain's Beatriz Ferrer-Salat won a bronze in freestyle, the first medal for Spain since 2005.

Competition format

The team and individual dressage competitions used the same results. Dressage had three phases. The first phase was the Grand Prix. Top 30 individuals advanced to the second phase, the Grand Prix Special where the first individual medals were awarded. The last set of medalsat the 2015 European Dressage Championships was awarded after the third phase, the Grand Prix Freestyle where top 15 combinations competed.

Schedule

All times are Central European Summer Time (UTC+2)

Results

References

2015 in equestrian